Pissing in the wind is an expression that means a futile effort. It may also refer to:

 a song by the British musician Badly Drawn Boy released in his album The Hour of Bewilderbeast 
 a song by Sole and the Skyrider Band released in their album Plastique
 a song by Jerry Jeff Walker released on his 1975 album Ridin' High